{{Infobox military conflict
| conflict          = Civil unrest in Italy (1919–1926)
| image             = March on Rome 1922 - Mussolini.jpg
| image_size        = 300px
| caption           = Benito Mussolini and Fascists during the March on Rome in 1922.
| partof            = 
| place             = Kingdom of Italy
| date              = April 15, 1919 – October 31, 1926
| result            = Ascension of Benito Mussolini as Prime Minister of Italy in 1922 after the March on Rome and Fascist takeover of the Italian government in 1924 following the assassination Giacomo Matteotti. Eventual repression of anti-Fascists and arrest of anti-Fascist leaders.
| combatant1        = Far-left and anti-Fascists
| combatant2        = Government| combatant3        = Fascist| commander1        =  Amadeo Bordiga  Antonio Gramsci  Errico Malatesta  Guido Picelli 
| commander2        = 1919–1922 Victor Emmanuel III Giovanni Giolitti Ivanoe Bonomi Luigi Facta1922–1926' Victor Emmanuel III Benito Mussolini
| commander3        =  Benito Mussolini 
| strength1         = 
| strength2         = 
| strength3         = 
| casualties1       = 
| casualties2       = 
| casualties3       = 
| notes             = |
}}

The Kingdom of Italy witnessed significant widespread civil unrest and political strife in the aftermath of World War I and the rise of the Far-right Fascist movement led by Benito Mussolini which opposed the rise of the international left, especially the far-left along with others who opposed Fascism.

History
Fascists and communists fought on the streets during this period as the two factions competed to gain power in Italy. The already tense political environment in Italy escalated into major civil unrest when Fascists began attacking their rivals, beginning on April 15, 1919 with Fascists attacking the offices of the Italian Socialist Party's newspaper Avanti!''.

Violence grew in 1921 with Royal Italian Army officers beginning to assist the Fascists with their violence against communists and socialists. With the Fascist movement growing, anti-fascists of various political allegiances (but generally of the international left) combined into the Arditi del Popolo (People's Militia) in 1921. With the threat of a general strike being initiated by anarchists, communists, and socialists, the Fascists launched a coup against the Italian government with the March on Rome in 1922 which pressured Prime Minister Luigi Facta to resign and allowed Mussolini to be appointed Prime Minister by the King Victor Emmanuel III. Two months after Mussolini took over as Prime Minister, Fascists attacked and killed members of the local labour movement in Turin in what became known as the 1922 Turin massacre. The next act of violence was the assassination of Socialist deputy Giacomo Matteotti by Fascist militant Amerigo Dumini in 1924. A right-wing fascist deputy, Armando Casalini, was killed on a tramway in retaliation for Matteotti's murder by the anti-fascist Giovanni Corvi. This was followed by a Fascist takeover of the Italian government and multiple assassination attempts were made against Mussolini in 1926, with the last attempt on October 31, 1926. On November 9, 1926, the Fascist government initiated emergency powers which resulted in the arrest of multiple anti-Fascists including communist Antonio Gramsci. Afterwards serious opposition to the Fascist regime collapsed.

Leaders of the factions 
Anarchist: Errico Malatesta, was a major leader of anarchists in Italy during this period.
Communist: Amadeo Bordiga and Antonio Gramsci were leaders of the Communist Party of Italy in this period whose members engaged in civil violence against Fascists.
Fascist: Benito Mussolini led the Fascists who opposed and engaged in violence with international leftists which were gaining prominence in the late 1910s and early 1920s.
Arditi del Popolo (People's Militia): Guido Picelli was the deputy of a  coalition formed in 1921 between various anti-Fascist groups including Malatesta's anarchists and Gramsci's communists among others including socialists, futurists, republicans, and syndicalists.

Notes 

Italian Fascism
Human rights abuses in Italy
Revolutions of 1917–1923
Riots and civil disorder in Italy